KXOO is a radio station airing a classic hits format licensed to Elk City, Oklahoma, broadcasting on 94.3 MHz FM.  The station is owned by Paragon Communications, Inc.

History
Prior to March 1, 2015, the station aired a Contemporary Christian music format and was known as The Rock.

References

External links

XOO